Maghraoua may refer to: 
Maghrawa, a Berber tribe
Maghraoua, Morocco a commune in Taza Province